Augustine Joseph "Gus" Rooney was an American sportswriter, baseball umpire, football referee, and sports announcer.

Rooney was born in Boston on January 8, 1892. He attended Harvard College as a special student in 1919–1920. He worked as a sportswriter for the Boston Traveler for several decades. On April 13, 1926, He became the first man to call a Boston Red Sox game, where he announced the opening day game for WNAC. That season, he also announced some Boston Braves games as well.

He subsequently returned to his work as a sportswriter at the Traveler, retiring in 1938. In addition to sportswriting, his obituary notes that he was a publicist for Suffolk Downs when it opened. He died in Buzzards Bay, Cape Cod, on December 21, 1978, at age 86.

References

1892 births
1978 deaths
20th-century American journalists
American football officials
American male journalists
American sports announcers
Baseball people from Massachusetts
Boston Braves announcers
Boston Red Sox announcers
Harvard College alumni
Major League Baseball broadcasters
Major League Baseball umpires
People from Bourne, Massachusetts
Sportspeople from Boston
Sportspeople from Barnstable County, Massachusetts
Suffolk Downs executives
Writers from Boston